The 1978 UCLA Bruins football team represented the University of California, Los Angeles during the 1978 NCAA Division I-A football season. The Pacific-8 Conference became the Pacific-10 Conference by adding Arizona and Arizona State to the league. This was Terry Donahue's third season as head coach of the Bruins.

Schedule

Awards and honors
 All-American: Kenny Easley (S, consensus), Jerry Robinson (LB, consensus), Manu Tuiasosopo (DT, second team)

References

UCLA
UCLA Bruins football seasons
UCLA Bruins football
UCLA Bruins football